In zoological nomenclature, a subspecific name is the third part of a trinomen. In zoology there is only one rank below that of species, namely "subspecies".

In botanical nomenclature, there are several levels of subspecific names, such as variety and form, and even cultivar.

The name of a subspecies is a trinomen, a trinomial name, i.e., a name that consists of three names: generic name, specific epithet, and subspecific epithet. The subspecific epithet is written like the specific epithet: without capitalisation but typeset in italics.

See also
 binomial nomenclature
 trinomen
 trinomial nomenclature
 in plants, an infraspecific taxon gets a three part name, a ternary name.

Zoological nomenclature